Robert Goldstein (died April 1974) was an American film producer who was briefly head of production at 20th Century Fox.

Goldstein began as a Broadway producer and entered the film industry in 1940. He was a producer for Universal‐International and Warner Brothers.

In the 1950s he was a vice president of Leonetti Goldstein Productions, headed by his twin brother, who died in 1954.

He became head of production for 20th Century Fox in Europe. After the death of Buddy Adler he was appointed studio production chief. He was only in the job for a year then returned to London to resume his former job.

He died in London.

References

American film producers
20th Century Studios people
Warner Bros. people
1974 deaths